The San Francisco Golden Gate Gales were an American soccer team that played in the United Soccer Association (USA). The team was based in San Francisco, California and played their home games at the Candlestick Park. The team folded when the USA merged with the National Professional Soccer League to form the North American Soccer League.

History 
In 1966 several groups of entrepreneurs were exploring the idea of forming a professional soccer league in United States. One of these groups, United Soccer Association (USA) led by Jack Kent Cooke, selected 12 cities for team locations and George Fleharty, owner of the Ice Follies, was awarded the San Francisco franchise.  The USA originally planned to start play in the spring of 1968; however the rival National Professional Soccer League, which secured a TV contract from CBS, announced it was ready to launch in 1967. Not wanting to let the rival league gain an advantage, the USA decided to launch early. Not having secured any player contracts, the league imported teams from Europe, Brazil, and Uruguay.  The Dutch team ADO Den Haag were brought over to represent the city of San Francisco.

The Gales opened the season at home against the Vancouver Royals with a 6-1 win in front of crowd of 8,177.  The Gales finished the season in second place with a record of 5 wins, 3 ties and 4 losses while drawing an average home league attendance of 5,422.

Following the 1967 season the United Soccer Association teams began to build clubs for the next season.  Retired Hungarian football player Ferenc Puskás was brought in to coach the Gales and began to assemble and train players.  However, in December 1968 the United Soccer Association and the National Professional Soccer League merged to form the North American Soccer League.  The Gales closed their franchise to yield to bay region to the Oakland Clippers and the owners bought an interest in the Vancouver Royals.

Year-by-year

Notes

References

G
Defunct soccer clubs in California
United Soccer Association franchises
ADO Den Haag
1967 establishments in California
1967 disestablishments in California
Soccer clubs in California
Association football clubs established in 1967
Association football clubs disestablished in 1967